Christian Prince may refer to:

Murder of Christian Prince, murder victim in New Haven, Connecticut.
The Education of a Christian Prince, a Renaissance "how-to" book for princes, by Desiderius Erasmus